Henicops tropicanus is a species of centipede in the Henicopidae family. It is endemic to Australia. It was first described in 2004 by Lauren Hollington and Gregory Edgecombe.

Distribution
The species occurs in the Wet Tropics of north-eastern Queensland. The type locality is the head of Roots Creek, near Mossman.

Behaviour
The centipedes are solitary terrestrial predators that inhabit plant litter and soil.

References

 

 
tropicanus
Centipedes of Australia
Endemic fauna of Australia
Fauna of Queensland
Animals described in 2004
Taxa named by Gregory Edgecombe